Mars mission may refer to:

Space missions
 Exploration of Mars, or any mission to assist in this endeavour
 List of missions to Mars
 List of Mars orbiters
 Mars Orbiter Mission, India's first interplanetary mission
 Mars rover mission(s)
 Human mission to Mars
 List of crewed Mars mission plans

Other uses
 Lego Mars Mission, a theme for Lego toys

See also

 Mission to Mars (disambiguation)